Hydrolyzed vegetable protein (HVP) products are foodstuffs obtained by protein hydrolysis and are used as ingredients to create a bouillon (broth) taste without the vegetables, bones, simmering, or other standard elements of creating bouillon from scratch.

Regarding the production process, a distinction can be made between acid-hydrolyzed vegetable protein (aHVP), enzymatically produced HVP, and other seasonings, e.g., fermented soy sauce. Hydrolyzed vegetable protein products are particularly used to round off the taste of soups, sauces, meat products, snacks, and other dishes, as well as for the production of ready-to-cook soups and bouillons.

History
Food technologists have long known that protein hydrolysis produces a meat bouillon-like odor and taste. In 1831, Berzelius obtained products having a meat bouillon taste when hydrolysing proteins with hydrochloric acid.

Fischer concluded amino acids contributed to the specific taste. In 1954, D. Phillips found that the bouillon odor required the presence of proteins containing threonine. Another important substance giving a characteristic taste is glutamic acid.

Julius Maggi produced acid-catalyzed hydrolyzed vegetable protein industrially for the first time in 1886.

Manufacture
Almost all products rich in protein are suitable for the production of HVP. Today, it is made mainly from protein resources of vegetable origin, such as maize meal, soybean meal, or wheat gluten.

Proteins consist of chains of amino acids joined together through amide bonds. When subjected to hydrolysis (hydrolyzed), the protein is broken down into its component amino acids. In industry, hydrochloric acid is used to perform this process. The remaining acid is then neutralized by mixing with an alkali such as sodium hydroxide, which leaves behind table salt, which comprises up to 20% of the final product (acid-hydrolyzed vegetable protein, aHVP). It is also possible to produce enzymatic HVP, using a protease instead for hydrolysis.

Process
The manufacturing process for HVP varies depending on the desired organoleptic properties of the end product. In general, common vegetable raw materials used in the production of HVP include defatted oil seeds (soy, grapeseed), and protein mainly from maize, wheat, pea, and rice.

For the production of aHVP, the proteins are hydrolyzed by cooking with a diluted (15–20%) hydrochloric acid, at a temperature between 90 and 120 °C for up to 8 hours. After cooling, the hydrolysate is neutralized with either sodium carbonate or sodium hydroxide to a pH of 5 to 6. The hydrolysate is filtered to remove the insoluble carbohydrate fraction (humin) and then further refined. The source of the raw material, concentration of the acid, the temperature of the reaction, the time of the reaction, and other factors can all affect the organoleptic properties of the final product. Activated carbon treatment can be employed to remove both flavor and color components, to the required specification.  Following a final filtration, the aHVP may, depending upon the application, be fortified with additional flavoring components. Thereafter, the product can be stored as a liquid at 30–40% dry matter, or alternatively it may be spray dried or vacuum dried and further used as a food ingredient.

For the production process of enzymatic HVP, enzymes are used to break down the proteins. To break down the protein to amino acids, proteases are added to the mixture of defatted protein and water. Since no salt is formed during the production process, adding salt as an ingredient is common practice to meet the criteria as described in the European Code of Practice for Bouillons and Consommés. Due to the sensitivity of enzymes to a specific pH, either an acid or a base is added to match the optimum pH. Depending on the activity of the enzymes, up to 24 hours are needed to break down the proteins. The mixture is heated to inactivate the enzymes and then filtered to remove the insoluble humic acid.

Composition
Liquid aHVP typically contains 55% water, 16% salt, 25% organic substances (thereof 20% protein (amino acids) analyzed as about 3% total nitrogen and 2% amino nitrogen).

According to the European Code of Practice for Bouillons and Consommés, hydrolyzed protein products intended for retail sale correspond to these characteristics:
 Specific gravity at 20 °C min.: 1.22
 Total nitrogen min.: 4% (on dry matter)
 Amino nitrogen min.: 1.3% (on dry matter)
 Sodium chloride max.: 50% (on dry matter)

Use
When foods are produced by canning, freezing, or drying, some flavor loss is almost inevitable. Manufacturers can use HVP to make up for it. Therefore, HVP is used in a wide variety of products such as in the spice, meat, fish, fine-food, snack, flavor, and soup industries.

As an allergen
Whether hydrolyzed vegetable protein is an allergen or not is contentious.

According to European law, wheat and soy are subject to allergen labelling in terms of Regulation (EU) 1169/2011 on food information to consumers. Since wheat and soy used for the production of HVP are not exempted from allergen labelling for formal reasons, HVP produced by using those raw materials has to be labelled with a reference to wheat or soy in the list of ingredients.

Nevertheless, strong evidence indicates at least aHVP is not allergenic, since proteins are degraded to single amino acids which are not likely to trigger an allergic reaction. An 2010 study  has shown that aHVP does not contain detectable traces of proteins or IgE-reactive peptides. This provides strong evidence that aHVP is very unlikely to trigger an allergic reaction to people who are intolerant or allergic to soy or wheat. Earlier peer-reviewed animal studies done in 2006 also indicate that soy-hypersensitive dogs do not react to soy hydrolysate, a proposed protein source for soy-sensitive dogs.

There are reports of a cosmetic-grade aHVP, Glupearl 19S (GP19S), inducing anaphylaxis when present in soap. Unlike food aHVP, this Japanese wheat aHVP is only very mildly hydrolyzed. The unusual chemical condition makes GP19S more allergenic than pure gluten. Newer regulations for cosmetic hydrolyzed wheat protein have been developed in response, requiring an average molecular mass of less than 3500 Da – about 35 residues long.   In theory, "an allergen must have at least 2 IgE-binding epitopes, and each epitope must be at least 15 amino acid residues long, to trigger a type 1 hypersensitivity reaction." Experiments also show that this degree of hydrolysis is sufficient to not trigger IgE binding from GP19S-allergic patients.

References

Chemical reactions
Food ingredients
Umami enhancers